Labor Defender   (1926–1937) was a magazine published by the International Labor Defense (ILD), itself a legal advocacy organization established in 1925 as the American section of the Comintern's International Red Aid network and thus as support to the Communist Party (which in 1926 was legally the Workers Party of America).

History
In January 1926, the ILD began publishing Labor Defender, as a monthly, profusely illustrated magazine with a low cover price of 10 cents. Magazine circulation boomed. It rose from some 1,500 paid subscriptions and 8,500 copies in bulk bundle sales in 1927 to some 5,500 paid subscriptions with a bundle sale of 16,500 by mid-1928. This mid-1928 circulation figure was said by Assistant Secretary Marty Abern to be "greater than the combined circulation of The Daily Worker, Labor Unity, and The Communist combined."

Outlook

Labor Defender depicted a black-and-white world of heroic trade unionists and dastardly factory owners, of oppressed African Americans struggling for freedom against the Ku Klux Klan and the use of state terror to stifle and divide and destroy all opposition. Writers included both non-party voices such as novelist Upton Sinclair, former Wobbly poet Ralph Chaplin, and Socialist Party leader Eugene V. Debs, as well as prominent Communists such as trade union leader William Z. Foster, cartoonist Robert Minor, and Benjamin Gitlow, a former political prisoner in New York.

The magazine made a constant plea for additional funds for jailed labor activists across the country. A regular column called "Voices from Prison" highlighted the plight of those behind bars and reinforced the message that good work was being done on the behalf of the so-called "class war prisoners" of America.

Masthead

The magazine's masthead included:

1926

January–August 1926
 Editor:  T. J. O' Flaherty
 Business: George Maurer
 National Officers: Andrew T. McNamara (Chairman), Edward C. Wentworth (Vice Chairman), James P. Cannon (Executive Secretary)

September–December 1926
 Editor:  Max Shachtman
 Business: George Maurer
 National Officers: Andrew T. McNamara (Chairman), Edward C. Wentworth (Vice Chairman), James P. Cannon (Executive Secretary)

1927

 Editor:  Max Shachtman
 Business: George Maurer
 National Officers: Elizabeth Gurley Flynn (Chairman), Edward C. Wentworth (Vice Chairman), James P. Cannon (Executive Secretary)

1928

January–November 1928
 Editor:  Max Shachtman
 Business: George Maurer
 National Officers: Elizabeth Gurley Flynn (Chairman), Edward C. Wentworth (Vice Chairman), James P. Cannon (Executive Secretary)

December 1928
 Editor:  Karl Reeve
 Business: George Maurer
 National Officers: Elizabeth Gurley Flynn (Chairman), Norman T. Tallentire (Assistant Secretary), Alfred Wagenknecht (Executive Secretary)

1929

January–April 1929
 Editor:  Karl Reeve
 Business: George Maurer
 National Officers: Elizabeth Gurley Flynn (Chairman), Norman T. Tallentire (Assistant Secretary), Alfred Wagenknecht (Executive Secretary)

May–June 1929
 Editor:  Karl Reeve
 Business: Walt Carmon
 National Officers: Elizabeth Gurley Flynn (Chairman), Edward G. Wentworth (Vice Chairman), Juliet Poyntz (Executive Secretary), Carl Kacker (Assistant Secretary)

July–August 1929
 Editor:  Karl Reeve
 Business: Walt Carmon
 National Officers: Elizabeth Gurley Flynn (Chairman), Edward G. Wentworth (Vice Chairman), Alfred Wagenknecht (Executive Secretary)

September–December 1929
 Editor:  J. Louis Engdahl
 National Officers: Elizabeth Gurley Flynn (Chairman), Edward G. Wentworth (Vice Chairman), J. Louis Engdahl (Executive Secretary)

1930

January–February 1930
 Editor:  J. Louis Engdahl
 National Officers: Elizabeth Gurley Flynn (Chairman), Edward G. Wentworth (Vice Chairman), J. Louis Engdahl (Executive Secretary)

March–June 1930
 Editor:  J. Louis Engdahl
 Associate Editor: Sol Auerbach
 National Officers: J. Louis Engdahl (General Secretary), George Maurer (Assistant Secretary), A. Jakira (Organizational Secretary)

July–December 1930
 Editor:  J. Louis Engdahl
 Associate Editor: Sol Auerbach
 National Officers: J. Louis Engdahl (General Secretary), Sam Darcy (Assistant Secretary), A. Jakira (Organizational Secretary)

1931
 Managing Editor:  Sender Garlin
 Editors:  William L. Patterson, Sasha Smalll
 Associate Editor: Sol Auerbach

1932

January–September 1932
 Editors:  J. Louis Engdahl, Sender Garlin, Joseph North

October–December 1932
 Editors:  J. Louis Engdahl, Joseph North
 Associate Editors:  Louis Colman, Sasha Small

1933

 Editors:  William L. Patterson, Joseph North
 Associate Editors:  Louis Colman, Sasha Small

1934

January 1934
 Managing Editor:  Sender Garlin
 Editors:  William L. Patterson, Sasha Small

February–December 1934
 Managing Editor:  Sender Garlin
 Editors:  William L. Patterson, Sasha Small
 Associate Editor:  Louis Colman

1935

January–June 1935
 Managing Editor: Nichola Wirth
 Editors: William L. Patterson, Sasha Small
 Associate Editor: Louis Colman
 Art Editor: Limbach

July–December 1935
 Editors: William L. Patterson, Sasha Small
 Associate Editor: Louis Colman

1936

January–March 1936
 Editors:  William L. Patterson, Sasha Small
 Associate Editor:  Louis Colman

April–May 1936
 Editor: Sasha Small
 Pacific Coast Editor:  Louis Colman
 Editorial Board:  Nathan Asch, Louis Colman, Anna Damon, Joseph Freeman, Jerre Mangione, Robert Minor, Maurice Rosenfield, Walter Wilson
 Contributing Editors:  Jack Conroy, Langston Hughes, John Howard Lawson, Waldo Frank

June–December 1936
 Editor:  Sasha Small
 Pacific Coast Editor:  Chester Arthor, Jr.
 Editorial Board:  Nathan Asch, Louis Colman, Anna Damon, Joseph Freeman, Jerre Mangione, Robert Minor, Maurice Rosenfield, Walter Wilson
 Contributing Editors:  Jack Conroy, Langston Hughes, John Howard Lawson, Waldo Frank

1937

 Editor:  Sasha Small
 Pacific Coast Editor:  Chester Arthor, Jr.
 Editorial Board:  Nathan Asch, Louis Colman, Anna Damon, Joseph Freeman, Jerre Mangione, Robert Minor, Maurice Rosenfield, Walter Wilson
 Contributing Editors:  Jack Conroy, Langston Hughes, John Howard Lawson, Waldo Frank

Pamphlet series

The magazine also published occasional pamphlets:

 Under Arrest! Worker’s Self-Defense in the Courts (1928)
 Smash the Frame up Against the Anthracite Miners—Free Boniat, Mendola and Moleski by B. F. Gebert (1928)
 Sedition to Protest and Organize Against War Hunger Unemployment by J. L. Engdahl (1930)
 The Story of the Imperial Valley by Frank Spector (introduction by John Dos Pasos) (1931)
 Tampa’s Reign of Terror by Anita Brenner and S. S. Windthrop (1933)
 Night Riders in Gallup by Louis Colman (1935)
 You Cannot Kill the Working-Class by Angelo Herndon (1936)

See also

 New Masses magazine
 Daily Worker newspaper
 The Masses
 The Liberator
 International Labor Defense 
 International Red Aid 
 Workers Party of America
 Comintern

References

External sources
 
 WorldCat

Communist periodicals published in the United States
Communist magazines
Defunct political magazines published in the United States
Magazines established in 1926
Magazines disestablished in 1937
Magazines published in New York City
Marxist magazines
Monthly magazines published in the United States